Ernie Rea (born Belfast, 1945) is a British radio presenter. He is also a freelance writer and consultant on interfaith issues. He graduated from Queen's University, Belfast, with degrees in History and Politics and in Theology. He was ordained as a Presbyterian minister in 1971.

In 1978, he joined the religious broadcasting section of the BBC, and eventually rose to become Head of Religious Broadcasting. He presented Beyond Belief, a programme on BBC Radio 4 that discusses religious issues, from 2001 to 2022. He is a member of the Three Faiths Forum, an organization which exists to foster understanding between the three faiths of Christianity, Judaism and Islam.

Rea is also a trainer with The Media Training Company, along with producer Geoff Deehan.

References

External links
Rethink2012.com

1945 births
Living people
British radio presenters
People from Belfast
Radio presenters from Northern Ireland
Presbyterian ministers